Donelson station is a train station in Nashville, Tennessee, serving the Music City Star regional rail system. It serves the neighborhood of Donelson. Service began September 18, 2006.

References

External links
Station from Google Maps Street View

Transportation buildings and structures in Nashville, Tennessee
Music City Star stations
Railway stations in the United States opened in 2006
2006 establishments in Tennessee